Sandeep Goud (born 8 November 1991) is an Indian-born cricketer who plays for the Oman national cricket team. In February 2019, he was named in Oman's Twenty20 International (T20I) squad for the 2018–19 Oman Quadrangular Series in Oman. He made his T20I debut for Oman against the Netherlands on 15 February 2019. Five days prior to his T20I debut, he played in Oman's Development XI team, in a twenty over fixture against Ireland, top-scoring with 55 not out. He made his List A debut for Oman against Scotland on 19 February 2019, following the 2018–19 Oman Quadrangular Series.

In March 2019, he was named in Oman's team for the 2019 ICC World Cricket League Division Two tournament in Namibia. Oman finished in the top four places in the tournament, therefore gaining One Day International (ODI) status. Goud made his ODI debut for Oman on 27 April 2019, against Namibia, in the tournament's final.

In September 2019, he was named in Oman's squad for the 2019 ICC T20 World Cup Qualifier tournament. In November 2019, he was named in Oman's squad for the 2019 ACC Emerging Teams Asia Cup in Bangladesh. In September 2021, he was named in Oman's squad for the 2021 ICC Men's T20 World Cup.

References

External links
 

1991 births
Living people
Omani cricketers
Oman One Day International cricketers
Oman Twenty20 International cricketers
Cricketers from Hyderabad, India
Indian emigrants to Oman
Indian expatriates in Oman